The Cold War ( – 1991) was a geopolitical, ideological, and economic struggle after World War II between the United States and the Soviet Union.

Cold War may also refer to:

Conflicts
 Cold war (general term)
 Phases of the Cold War:
 Cold War (1947–1948)
 Cold War (1948–1953)
 Cold War (1953–1962)
 Cold War (1962–1979)
 Cold War (1979–1985)
 Cold War (1985–1991)
 Middle Eastern Cold War (disambiguation)
 Second Cold War, a term used to describe post-Cold War political and militarist tensions between geopolitical blocs of Russia and/or China and the United States, European Union, and NATO.

Media

Film and television
 Cold War (1951 film), a Disney film starring Goofy
 Cold War (2012 film), a Hong Kong police thriller film
 Cold War (2018 film), a Polish film by Pawel Pawlikowski
 Cold War (TV series), a 1998 documentary series about the Cold War
 "Cold War" (Code Lyoko episode)
 "Cold War" (Doctor Who)
 "The Cold War" (Person of Interest)
 Temporal Cold War, a fictional conflict in the Star Trek universe

Literature 
 "Cold War" (short story), a 1957 science fiction short story by Arthur C. Clarke

Music 
 Cold War (band), an American hardcore punk band
 "Cold War" (song), a 2010 song by Janelle Monáe
 "Cold War", a song by Death from Above 1979 from You're a Woman, I'm a Machine
 "Cold War", a song by Devo from Freedom of Choice
 "Cold War", a song by Funker Vogt from Maschine Zeit
"Cold War", a song by Janelle Monae from The Archandroid
 "Cold War", a song by Myka Relocate from Lies to Light the Way
 "Cold War", a song by Styx from Kilroy Was Here

Video games
 Cold War (Star Wars), a fictional conflict in Star Wars: The Old Republic
 Cold War (video game), a 2005 computer game developed by Mindware Studios
 Toy Soldiers: Cold War, a 2011 XBLA game developed by Signal Studios
 Call of Duty: Black Ops Cold War, a video game in the Call of Duty series

Other uses
 Cold War (ice hockey), an outdoor ice hockey game played in 2001
 The Big Chill at the Big House or Cold War II, an ice hockey game

See also
 Cold Like War, a 2017 album by American band We Came as Romans